The 1944–45 Puebla season was the first professional season of Mexico's top-flight football league. This was the first season the club played in the Mexican professional league. The club had joined a year after the league began competition in 1943. Puebla finished second in the league to Club Espana and managed to establishment itself as one of the countries powerful clubs.

League
1944-45 season was the first the club played in the First Division after being invited by the league in 1943.

Matchday

Puebla had by weeks in rounds :2,4,5,7,12,14,17,19,23,28,30,34

Copa Mexico

Matches

Puebla Had by weeks in rounds 3 and 4th .

Final phase

First leg:

Second leg:

Semi-final

 América bye to Final

Final

Goalscorers

See also 
1944–45 Mexican Primera División season
1944–45 Copa México
Liga MX

References
Mexico - List of final tables (RSSSF)
- Mexico 1944/45 (RSSSF)

1945-46
Mex
1945–46 in Mexican football